Blues Albums is a music chart published weekly by Billboard magazine which ranks the top selling blues albums in the United States, ranked by sales data as compiled by Nielsen SoundScan. The chart debut as the Top Blues Albums in the issue dated September 2, 1995, as a 15-position chart with its first number one being Eric Clapton's From the Cradle.

Its introduction was a culmination of commercial realities at the time and a recognition of the "enduring legacy and artistic force of this timeless genre".

Number-one blues albums of the 1990s
These are the albums which have reached number one on the Blues Albums chart during the 1990s, listed chronologically. Note that Billboard publishes charts with an issue date approximately 7–10 days in advance.

References

External links

United States Blues
Blues 1990s